Blenn Bean (born February 13, 1977) is a retired Bermudian football player.

Club career
Bean began his career with PHC Zebras, and played for the team for five years in the Bermudian Premier Division before joining the Bermuda Hogges in the USL Second Division in 2008.

International career
He made his debut for Bermuda in a January 2000 friendly match against Canada and earned a total of 12 caps, scoring no goals.

His final international match was a January 2007 CONCACAF Gold Cup qualification match against Haiti.

References

External links

1977 births
Living people
Association football defenders
Bermudian footballers
Bermuda international footballers
PHC Zebras players
Bermuda Hogges F.C. players
USL Second Division players